This is a list of casinos in Ohio.

History 
Casinos were prohibited in Ohio before 2009, so gamblers instead visited casinos in Indiana, Pennsylvania, West Virginia, and Michigan where they were permitted. In November 2009, Ohio voters approved a measure that would allow for four casinos to be established in the state, one each in Cincinnati, Columbus, Cleveland and Toledo. The casinos were expected to generate $600 million in revenue, with fees collected there to be redistributed to school districts and local governments in the state. It passed by a vote of 53 to 47.

List of casinos

Gallery

See also

List of casinos in the United States 
List of casino hotels

References

Citations

Bibliography

External links

Ohio
Casinos